Alexander Alexandrovich Shubin (born 14 July 1983) is a Russian former competitive figure skater. He is the 2003 World Junior champion and the 2002 JGP Final champion. He retired from competition in 2007. He works as a coach in Moscow.

Programs

Competitive highlights
GP: Grand Prix; JGP: Junior Grand Prix

References

External links 
 

1983 births
Living people
Russian male single skaters
Figure skaters from Moscow
World Junior Figure Skating Championships medalists